Omar Benzerga (born 13 March 1990) is an Algerian former professional footballer who played as a midfielder.

Club career
On 14 June 2010, Benzerga signed a four-year contract with Ligue 2 side FC Nantes, joining on a free transfer from Lille OSC.

On 31 July 2010, Benzerga made his professional debut, starting for Nantes in their Coupe de la Ligue game against Boulogne. A week later, on 9 August 2010, he made his league debut for Nantes in the opening game of the 2010–11 Ligue 2 season against Le Mans starting the game before being subbed off in the 67th minute. On 16 June 2012, he was fired by his club Nantes and banned for three years by the French Football Federation.

International career
Benzerga played for the France U17 national team participating in the 2007 UEFA European Under-17 Football Championship where France reached the semi-finals. He started all four of France's games at the competition.

In September 2009, Benzerga was called up to the Algerian U23 national team for a ten-day training camp in Beaucaire, France. He was called up again for another training camp in Algiers in December 2009.

References

External links
 
 

1990 births
Living people
People from Châtellerault
Sportspeople from Vienne
French sportspeople of Algerian descent
Algerian footballers
French footballers
Footballers from Nouvelle-Aquitaine
Association football midfielders
Algeria under-23 international footballers
France youth international footballers
Ligue 2 players
Algerian Ligue Professionnelle 1 players
SO Châtellerault players
Lille OSC players
FC Nantes players
JSM Béjaïa players
Royal Excel Mouscron players
JS Saoura  players
ASM Oran players
Algerian expatriate footballers
French expatriate footballers
Algerian expatriate sportspeople in Belgium
French expatriate sportspeople in Belgium
Expatriate footballers in Belgium